Jay Edwards is an American politician serving as a State Representative in the Ohio House of Representatives for the 94th District. He is a Republican. The 94th district consists of Meigs County, as well as portions of Athens, Vinton, and Washington counties. Edwards additionally serves as the Majority Whip of the Ohio House.

Life and career
Edwards was born and raised in Nelsonville, Ohio, where he graduated from Nelsonville-York High School and still resides today.  After high school he attended nearby Ohio University on a football scholarship, where he studied mathematics. Edwards is a licensed realtor, and recently begun work in medical sales within the drug treatment market.

Ohio House of Representatives
In 2016, Representative Debbie Phillips was term-limited and ineligible to run for a fifth term.  A Democrat, Phillips had only faced one serious election in her four terms, in 2014, where she won by just over 100 votes. However, despite Athens County, the largest in the district, being considered reliably Democratic, Republicans had historically seen success in winning the district prior to Phillips' taking the seat. Democrats nonetheless fielded Sarah Grace, a small-business owner from Athens who was a newcomer to politics and a liberal. Despite being considered the favorite, Edwards raised considerable money, albeit not without controversy. In the end, in what was a very good year for Republicans, Edwards defeated Grace by a 58% to 42% margin, taking the seat.

Edwards is the first Republican to hold the seat since Jimmy Stewart held the seat from 2003 to 2008.

In 2018, Edwards defeated Democrat Taylor Sappington to retain the seat.

In the 2020 general election, Edwards faced Democrat Katie O'Neill.

Electoral history

References

External links
Ohio State Representative Jay Edwards official site

Living people
Ohio University alumni
Republican Party members of the Ohio House of Representatives
People from Nelsonville, Ohio
21st-century American politicians
Year of birth missing (living people)